Thraustochytrium pachydermum is a species of heterokont.

References

Heterokonts